Eva Bengtson Skogsberg, born in 1951, is a Swedish politician of the Moderate Party. She has been a member of the Riksdag (Parliament of Sweden) since 2006.

References

 Eva Bengtson Skogsberg at the Riksdag website

Living people
1951 births
Members of the Riksdag from the Moderate Party
Women members of the Riksdag
Members of the Riksdag 2006–2010
Members of the Riksdag 2010–2014
21st-century Swedish women politicians